Scandinavian Music Group (or SMG) is a Finnish band founded in 2002 by former Ultra Bra members. They have released nine albums as of 2022.

Band members
 Terhi Kokkonen: vocals (2002–)
 Joel Melasniemi: guitar (2002–)
 Antti Lehtinen: drums (2002–)
 Olli Äkräs: guitar, keyboards (2013-)
 Oskari Halsti: bass (2014–)
 Pauliina Kokkonen: backing vocals (2007–)
 Miikka Paatelainen: lap steel (2007–)

Past members
 Tommi Saarikivi: bass (2002–2003)
 Kyösti Salokorpi: guitar, keyboards (2003–2013)
 Anssi Växby: bass (2003–2014)

Discography

Albums 

Compilation albums

Singles 
Charting singles

Songs
 Kun tuuli oli viilee / Kun puut tekee seittiä (2002)
 Tällaisena kesäyönä / Ei mulle riitä (2002)
 Minne katosi päivät (promo) (2002)
 Ei mun oo hyvä olla yksin / Mitä hyödyttää (2002)
 Letitä tukkani / Nää aamut (2003)
 100 km Ouluun (2004)
 Säälittävä syksy (promo) (2004)
 Huomisen sää (promo) (2004)
 Valmis (promo) (2005)
 Hölmö rakkaus (promo) (2006)
 Ylpeä sydän (promo) (2006)
 Vieläkö soitan banjoa? (promo) (2007)
 Mustana, maidolla, kylmänä, kuumana (promo) (2007)
 Naurava turskan kallo (promo) (2007)
 Levoton tuhkimo (promo) (2008) (Dingo cover)
 Näin minä vihellän matkallani (promo) (2009)
 Casablanca / Ambulanssi tuli ja kaikki itki (promo) (2009)
 100 km Ouluun (2009 versio) (promo) (2009)
 Hautojen yli (2011)
 Kaunis Marjaana  (2012)
 Balladi 1 (2013)

References

External links
Official website

Finnish musical groups